The Nutcracker (also written as The Nut-Cracker) is a 1926 American silent comedy film directed by Lloyd Ingraham and starring Edward Everett Horton, Mae Busch, and Harry Myers. It was based on the 1920 novel The Nut Cracker by Frederic S. Isham.

Synopsis
Horatio Slipaway is struck by a streetcar and to escape his domineering wife he feigns amnesia. After using his insurance payout to invest in the stock market, he manages to make a fortune and adopts a new identity as a Peruvian millionaire.

Cast

References

Bibliography
 Connelly, Robert B. The Silents: Silent Feature Films, 1910-36, Volume 40, Issue 2. December Press, 1998.
 Munden, Kenneth White. The American Film Institute Catalog of Motion Pictures Produced in the United States, Part 1. University of California Press, 1997.

External links

1926 films
1926 comedy films
1920s English-language films
American silent feature films
Silent American comedy films
American black-and-white films
Films directed by Lloyd Ingraham
Associated Exhibitors films
1920s American films